The International Friendship Tournament is a football tournament held annually in Doha, Qatar since 2002. It is now a tournament for youth teams, but used to be for senior teams and Olympic teams.

Champions

Editions
2002: Olympic (U-23)
2003: Olympic (U-23)
2004: Olympic (U-23)
2005: Olympic (U-23)
2006: U-20
2007: Olympic (U-23)
2008: U-20
2009: U-20
2010: Senior
2012: U-20
2013: Olympic (U-23)

  
International association football competitions hosted by Qatar
Recurring sporting events established in 2002
2002 establishments in Qatar